Georg Albert, Prince of Schwarzburg-Rudolstadt (23 November 1838 – 19 January 1890) was the penultimate sovereign prince of Schwarzburg-Rudolstadt.

Biography
He was born in Rudolstadt the son of Prince Albert of Schwarzburg-Rudolstadt and his wife Princess Augusta of Solms-Braunfels (1804–1865). Princess Augusta was the daughter of Prince Friedrich Wilhelm of Solms-Braunfels (1770–1814) and his wife Duchess Frederica of Mecklenburg-Strelitz (1778–1841), the daughter of Grand Duke Charles II.

Following the death of his uncle Friedrich Günther on 28 June 1867, his father Albert ascended the throne thereby making Georg the heir apparent with the title Hereditary Prince. His father died on 26 November 1869, two years after ascending the throne, with Georg becoming the new sovereign prince.

During his reign, the North German Confederation was dissolved following the victory of the Kingdom of Prussia backed by states of the confederation in the Franco-Prussian War over the Second French Empire. As a result, on 18 January 1871, the King of Prussia was proclaimed German Emperor and so Prince Georg no longer ruled over an independent state as Schwarzburg-Rudolstadt became a state of the German Empire and therefore Prince Georg was subordinate to the German Emperor.

Personal life
Prince Georg was engaged to Duchess Marie of Mecklenburg-Schwerin, his second cousin once removed and stepdaughter of his cousin Grand Duchess Marie of Mecklenburg-Schwerin. She broke off the engagement to marry Grand Duke Vladimir Alexandrovich of Russia. After that, he never married and following his death in Rudolstadt he was succeeded as prince by his first cousin once removed Günther. He was buried in Stadtkirche in Rudolstadt.

Honours
 : Knight of St. Hubert, 1858
  Kingdom of Prussia:
 Knight of the Red Eagle, 3rd Class with Swords, 1864; 1st Class with Swords, 1871; Grand Cross with Swords on Ring, 12 October 1880
 Member of Honour of the Johanniter Order, 1884
    Ernestine duchies: Grand Cross of the Saxe-Ernestine House Order, October 1865
 : Grand Cross of the Ludwig Order, 28 November 1865
 : Grand Cross of the Order of Duke Peter Friedrich Ludwig, with Golden Crown, 3 January 1870
  Duchy of Anhalt: Grand Cross of Albert the Bear, 1872
 :
 Knight of the Military Order of St. Henry, 1872
 Knight of the Rue Crown, 1882

Ancestry

References

External links

1838 births
1890 deaths
German princes
House of Schwarzburg
Generals of Cavalry (Prussia)